Clubul Sportiv Municipal Mediaș, commonly known as CSM Mediaș or simply Mediaș, is a Romanian basketball club based in Mediaș. currently participates in the Liga Națională, the top-tier league in Romania.

The team was founded in 2003 as Gaz Metan Mediaș and promoted for the first time in Liga Națională in 2004. The best place since then has been 2nd, in 2010. In the 2010–11 and 2012–13 season, the club won the Romanian Cup. In 2015 the basketball section of Gaz Metan was dissolved and in 2016 the entire club went into insolvency.

In 2017 the basketball section was refounded as a section of the Municipality of Mediaș sports club, CSM Mediaș and initially played in the second-tier, Liga I. However, in 2018 the league was merged with the top-tier Liga Națională.

Trophies
Romanian Cup 
Champions (2): 2011, 2013

Current roster

Season by season

Notable players

 Deven Mitchell
 Marko Dimitrijević

References

External links

CSM Mediaș at totalbaschet.ro

Basketball teams in Romania
Basketball teams established in 2017
2017 establishments in Romania
Mediaș
Basketball teams disestablished in 2020